The following Confederate States Army units and commanders fought in the Battle of Antietam of the American Civil War. The Union order of battle is listed separately. Order of battle compiled from the army organization during the campaign, the casualty returns and the reports.

Abbreviations used

Military rank
 Gen = General
 MG = Major General
 BG = Brigadier General
 Col = Colonel
 Ltc = Lieutenant Colonel
 Maj = Major
 Cpt = Captain
 Lt = Lieutenant

Other
 (w) = wounded
 (mw) = mortally wounded
 (k) = killed in action
 (c) = captured

Army of Northern Virginia

Gen Robert E. Lee

Right Wing
MG James Longstreet

Left Wing
MG Thomas J. Jackson

Chief of Artillery: Col Stapleton Crutchfield

Escort:
 4th Virginia Cavalry, Company H: Cpt Robert Randolph
 White's Virginia Cavalry (3 companies): Cpt Elijah V. White

Artillery Reserve

Cavalry

Notes

References
 Antietam National Battlefield
 Sears, Stephen W., Landscape Turned Red: The Battle of Antietam. Boston: Houghton Mifflin, 1983. .
 Sibley, Jr., F. Ray, The Confederate Order of Battle, Volume 1, The Army of Northern Virginia, Shippensburg, Pennsylvania, 1996. 
 U.S. War Department, The War of the Rebellion: a Compilation of the Official Records of the Union and Confederate Armies, U.S. Government Printing Office, 1880–1901.

American Civil War orders of battle
Order of Battle